Ruth Lercher Bornstein is an American author and illustrator of children's and young adult books, and painter.

Biography
Ruth Lercher Bornstein grew up in Wisconsin and graduated from the University of Wisconsin-Madison in 1948 with a degree in Art Education, after which she taught art for children at the Lenox Hill Neighborhood House in New York. She later attended the Cranbrook Academy of Art in Michigan before moving with her husband to Los Angeles.

Her first book Indian Bunny, reissued as Brave Bunny, was published in 1973.

Books
 Indian Bunny, Golden Gate Junior Books, 1973; reissued as Brave Bunny, Gibbs Smith, 2003. 
 Little Gorilla, Seabury Press/Clarion Books, 1976.
 The Dream of the Little Elephant, Seabury Press/Clarion, 1977
 Jim, Seabury Press/Clarion, 1978
 The Dancing Man, Seabury Press/Clarion, 1978
 I'll Draw a Meadow, Harper & Row, 1979
 Of Course a Goat, Harper & Row, 1980
 The Seedling Child, Harcourt Brace Jovanovich, 1987
 A Beautiful Seashell, Harper & Row, 1990
 Rabbit's Good News, Houghton Mifflin/Clarion, 1995
 That's How It Is When We Draw, Houghton Mifflin/Clarion, 1997
 Butterflies and Lizards, Beryl and Me, Cavendish Square Publishing, 2002
 The Summer Everything Changed, Wellstone Press, 2012

External links
 Official website

Living people
20th-century American writers
21st-century American women writers
20th-century American women writers
Year of birth missing (living people)